The Court of the County of Durham was a court that exercised jurisdiction within the County Palatine of Durham. It was abolished, subject to certain savings, on 5 July 1836.

The sole roll of this court known not to have been lost is DCM Misc Ch 5722. It includes material from the years 1403 and 1404.

Abolition
Section 2 of the Durham (County Palatine) Act 1836 provided:

Compensation

See sections 4 and 5 of the Durham (County Palatine) Act 1836.

See also
Courts of the County Palatine of Durham

References
Kenneth Emsley and Constance Mary Fraser. The Courts of the County Palatine of Durham from the Earliest Times to 1971. Durham County Local History Society. Durham. 1984.
"The Durham County Court" in "The courts and their records" in "Palatinate of Durham Records". Durham University.
William Parson and William White. History, Directory, and Gazetteer, of the Counties of Durham and Northumberland. Printed for W White & Co by Edward Baines and Son. 1827. Volume 1. Page 187. 1828. Volume 2. Page 60.
Eneas Mackenzie and Marvin Ross. An Historical, Topographical, and Descriptive View of the County Palatine of Durham. Mackenzie and Dent. Pilgrim Street, Newcastle. 1834. Volume 2. Page 423. Google Books:  
William Hutchinson. The History and Antiquities of the County Palatine of Durham. Printed for S Hodgson and Messrs Robinsons. Newcastle. 1787. Volume 2. Page 279.
Gailard Thomas Lapsley. The County Palatine of Durham: A Study in Constitutional History. (Harvard Historical Studies, volume 8). 1900. Pages 71, 111, 126, 127, 195 and 206. Internet Archive:  
Christian Drummond Liddy. The Bishopric of Durham in the Late Middle Ages: Lordship, Community and the Cult of St Cuthbert. The Boydell Press. Woodbridge. 2008. Pages 127, 132, 155, 167 and 200 to 202. Google Books
Peacock v Bell and Kendall (1667) 1 Wm Saund 69. See also glosses on this case by Vernon and Raithby  and Coventry and Hughes  and Barbour 
Jewett v Summons. The Law Journal For The Year 1825. Volume III. Court of King's Bench. Page 220.
Henry Donkin. "Return of all writs issued out of the County Court of Durham from 1st of January 1826 to 31st December 1835". 22 April 1836. Return to an Address of the House of Commons. Ordered to be printed 9 May 1836. Parliamentary Papers. Volume 43.

Former courts and tribunals in England and Wales 
Legal history of England 
History of County Durham
1836 disestablishments in England
Courts and tribunals disestablished in 1836